Pete Walker (born 4 July 1939) is an English film director, writer, and producer, specializing in horror and sexploitation films, frequently combining the two.

Biography
Walker was born on 4 July 1939 in Brighton, England, the son of stand-up comic Syd Walker and a showgirl mother. He began his performing career as a stand-up comic while a teenager, but quit at age 19.

Walker made films such as Die Screaming, Marianne, The Flesh and Blood Show, House of Whipcord, Frightmare, House of Mortal Sin, Schizo, The Comeback, and House of the Long Shadows.

His films often featured sadistic authority figures, such as priests or judges, punishing anyone — usually young women —  who doesn't conform to their strict personal moral codes, but he has denied there being any political subtext to his films.  Because of the speed with which he had to make his films, Walker often used the same reliable actors, including Andrew Sachs and Sheila Keith, the latter playing memorable villainesses in four of Walker's pictures.

Walker decided to retire from filmmaking after his last film in order to focus on buying and restoring cinemas.

Malcolm McLaren hired Walker to direct a documentary on The Sex Pistols entitled A Star Is Dead. Walker was an unlikely choice of director for this project and the deal fell through when the band split up.

Walker's work was reviled and condemned by some contemporary critics, while others were surprised to find relatively sophisticated subtexts in what were made and marketed as commercial exploitation films. Although Walker's movies have never undergone a critical reappraisal in the same way as Hammer films or his American contemporaries Tobe Hooper and Wes Craven, the release in 2005 of a DVD boxed set of five of his films was greeted with some good notices in the British national press.

On his own work, Walker has said when asked if his films had hidden depths, "Of course they didn't. But recently I had to record commentary for the DVD releases, so I saw the films for the first time since making them, and you know what? They're not as bad as I thought. But searching for hidden meaning ... they were just films. All I wanted to do was create a bit of mischief."

Filmography

See also
Derek Ford
Stanley Long
David McGillivray
Norman J. Warren

References

Sources

Further reading
Keeping the British End Up: Four Decades of Saucy Cinema by Simon Sheridan (fourth edition) (Titan Publishing, London) (2011)

External links

Mondo-digital.com

1939 births
Living people
People from Brighton
English film directors
Horror film directors
English film producers
English screenwriters
English male screenwriters